In mathematics, more specifically group theory, the three subgroups lemma is a result concerning commutators. It is a consequence of Philip Hall and Ernst Witt's eponymous identity.

Notation
In what follows, the following notation will be employed:

 If H and K are subgroups of a group G, the commutator of H and K, denoted by [H, K], is defined as the subgroup of G generated by commutators between elements in the two subgroups.  If L is a third subgroup, the convention that [H,K,L] = [[H,K],L] will be followed.
 If H is a subgroup of a group G, then the centralizer of H in G will be denoted by CG(H).

Statement 
Let X, Y and Z be subgroups of a group G, and assume

 and 

Then .

Proof and the Hall–Witt identity

Hall–Witt identity

If , then

 

Proof of the three subgroups lemma

Then , and by the Hall–Witt identity above, it follows that  and so . Since these elements generate , we conclude that  and hence .

See also
Commutator
Lower central series
Grün's lemma
Jacobi identity

Notes

References
 

Lemmas in group theory
Articles containing proofs